Newbould is a surname. Notable people with the name include:
Alfred Ernest Newbould (1873–1952), British cinematographer and politician
Brian Newbould (born 1936), British composer, conductor and author
Frank Parkinson Newbould (1887–1951), English poster artist
Harry Newbould (1861–1928), English football manager
Julieanne Newbould (born 1957), Australian actress
Thomas Newbould (1880–1964), English rugby player

See also
Newbold (name)
Newbolt